Agelasta illecideosa is a species of beetle in the family Cerambycidae. It was described by Stephan von Breuning in 1967. It is known from Borneo.

References

illecideosa
Beetles described in 1967